Élizabeth Giguère (born May 8, 1997) is a Canadian ice hockey player for the Boston Pride of the Premier Hockey Federation (PHF). She played college ice hockey at Clarkson and Minnesota Duluth. She is a two-time First Team CCM/AHCA All-American and the winner of the Patty Kazmaier Award in 2020. She is daughter of the Stanley Cup and World champion goaltender Jean-Sébastien Giguère.

Playing career

Collegiate career
Giguère began her collegiate career for Clarkson during the 2017–18 season. During her freshman season, Giguère recorded 27 goals and 44 assists, setting Clarkson's program record for freshman scoring with 71 points. She was named the HCA National Rookie of the Month in December and March. She was also named the ECAC Hockey Rookie of the Month in October, December, January, and March. During the 2018 NCAA National Collegiate Women's Ice Hockey Tournament, she recorded the game-winning goal in overtime to send Clarkson to the Frozen Four. During the National Championship game against Colgate, she again recorded the game-winning goal in overtime, helping lead Clarkson to their second consecutive NCAA Tournament championship. Following the tournament, she was named to the 2018 Frozen Four All-Tournament team. Following an outstanding freshman season, she was named to the ECAC Hockey All-Rookie Team, ECAC Hockey First Team All-League, ECAC Hockey Rookie of the Year, and a Second-Team All-American.

During the 2018–19 season, Giguère led the NCAA in scoring, recording 26 goals and 47 assists in 40 games. She recorded a Clarkson program record five shorthanded goals during the season. She was named the ECAC Hockey Player of the Month in November, after she recorded 15 points in 10 games, including a nation-high 12 goals during the month. She recorded her first career hat-trick in 5–1 victory over Yale on January 18, 2019. During the 2019 NCAA National Collegiate Women's Ice Hockey Tournament, she recorded the game-winning goal in overtime against Boston College to send Clarkson to the Frozen Four for the fourth consecutive season. This was her third game-winning overtime goal in four NCAA Tournament games. Following an outstanding sophomore season, she was named to the ECAC Hockey Second Team All-League, a Top 10 Patty Kazmaier Award finalist, a First Team All-American, and USCHO.com Player of the Year.

During the 2019–20 season, Giguère led the NCAA in goals, recording 37 goals in 37 games, and tied for second in the NCAA in scoring with 66 points. She tied for the nation lead in game-winning goals with 10, and tied for second in the nation in shorthanded goals with three. She also led the conference in goals (23), points (41) and points per game (1.86). She led the nation in goals in November, recording 12 goals in 10 games, and was subsequently named ECAC Hockey's Player of the Month for November. On December 6, 2019, she recorded her 105th career assist in a 5–0 victory over RPI, setting a Clarkson program record, surpassing the previous record of 104 set by Jamie Lee Rattray and Erin Ambrose. She led the conference in assists (9) and points (13) in January, and was subsequently named ECAC Hockey's Player of the Month for January, and NCAA First Star of the Week for the week ending January 28, 2020. After an outstanding junior season, she was named to the ECAC Hockey First Team All-League, ECAC Hockey Player of the Year, ECAC Hockey's Best Forward, a First Team All-American for the second consecutive season, and was awarded the Patty Kazmaier Award.

On May 20, 2021, Giguère announced she would join Minnesota Duluth for the 2021–22 season as a graduate transfer. She recorded 22 goals and 40 assists in 40 games, to lead the Bulldogs in scoring, and help them advance to the Frozen Four. She finished her collegiate career with 295 points in 177 games, ranking sixth all-time in NCAA Division I history in scoring.

Professional career
On July 28, 2022, Giguère signed a one-year contract with the Boston Pride of the Premier Hockey Federation.

International play
Giguère represented Canada at the 2015 IIHF World Women's U18 Championship where she ranked second on the team in scoring, recording three goals and four assists in five games, and won a silver medal. She also represented  at the 2017 Nations Cup where she recorded two goals and one assist in five games and won a silver medal.

Career statistics

Regular season and playoffs

International

Awards and honours

References

External links
 
 Élizabeth Giguère at US College Hockey Online (USCHO)

1997 births
Living people
Canadian expatriate ice hockey players in the United States
Canadian women's ice hockey forwards
Clarkson Golden Knights women's ice hockey players
Ice hockey people from Quebec City
Minnesota Duluth Bulldogs women's ice hockey players
Patty Kazmaier Award winners